Vladimir or Volodymyr Bondarenko may refer to:

 Vladimir Bondarenko (football coach) (1955–2016), Russian football coach
 Volodymyr Bondarenko (footballer) (born 1981), Ukrainian footballer and coach
 Volodymyr Bondarenko (politician) (born 1952), Ukrainian politician, People's Deputy of Ukraine